The Biceratopsinae is an extinct subfamily of redlichiid trilobites within the family Biceratopsidae, with species of small to average size. Species belonging to this subfamily lived during the Toyonian stage (Upper Olenellus-zone), 516-513 million years ago, in the former continent of Laurentia, including what are today the South-Western United States and Canada.

Etymology 
The Biceratopsinae are named for the type species Biceratops nevadensis.

Habitat 
The Biceratopsinae were probably marine bottom dweller, like all Olenellina.

References 

Cambrian trilobites
Cambrian Series 2 first appearances
Cambrian Series 2 extinctions
Biceratopsidae
Arthropod subfamilies